El Gouna Airport  is an airport serving the Red Sea resort town of El Gouna, Egypt.

The Hurghada VOR-DME (Ident: HGD) is located 12.6 nautical miles off the threshold of runway 34.

See also
Transport in Egypt
List of airports in Egypt

References

 Google Earth

External links
 OurAirports - Egypt
 OpenStreetMap - El Gouna
 El Gouna Airport

Airports in Egypt